Dublin City South was a parliamentary constituency represented in Dáil Éireann, the lower house of the Irish parliament or Oireachtas, from 1921 to 1948 on the southside of Dublin City. The method of election was proportional representation by means of the single transferable vote (PR-STV).

History and boundaries
The borough constituency of Dublin South existed in Dublin City from 1921 to 1948. The first constituency of this name was created by the Government of Ireland Act 1920 as a 4-seat constituency for the Southern Ireland House of Commons and a single-seat constituency for the United Kingdom House of Commons at Westminster, combining the former Westminster constituencies of St Patrick's and St Stephen's Green. At the 1921 election for the Southern Ireland House of Commons, the four seats were won uncontested by Sinn Féin, who treated it as part of the election to the Second Dáil. It was never used as a Westminster constituency; under s. 1(4) of the Irish Free State (Agreement) Act 1922, no writ was to be issued "for a constituency in Ireland other than a constituency in Northern Ireland". Therefore, no vote was held in Dublin South at the 1922 United Kingdom general election on 15 November 1922, shortly before the Irish Free State left the United Kingdom on 6 December 1922. It was restructured by the Electoral Act 1923, the first electoral act of the new state.

TDs 1921–1948

Elections

1944 general election
Full figures for the second count to the eighth count are unavailable. Byrne, Bourke and Hannigan all lost their deposits.

1943 general election
Full figures for the second to the fifteenth counts are unavailable. Dowling, Donnelly, Hynes, Sheehy-Skeffington, Rice, Keogh, Hosey and O'Higgins all lost their deposits.

1939 by-election
Following the death of Fine Gael TD James Beckett, a by-election was held on 6 June 1939. The seat was won by the Fianna Fáil candidate John McCann.

1938 general election

1937 general election

1933 general election

1932 general election

September 1927 general election

1927 by-election
Following the death of Fianna Fáil TD Constance Markievicz, a by-election was held on 24 August 1927. The seat was won by the Cumann na nGaedheal candidate Thomas Hennessy.

June 1927 general election

1925 by-election
Following the resignation of Cumann na nGaedheal TD Daniel McCarthy, a by-election was held on 11 March 1925. The seat was won by the Cumann na nGaedheal candidate Thomas Hennessy.

November 1924 by-election
Following the appointment of Cumann na nGaedheal TD Hugh Kennedy as Chief Justice, a by-election was held on 18 November 1924. The seat was won by the Republican candidate Seán Lemass.

March 1924 by-election
Following the death of Cumann na nGaedheal TD Philip Cosgrave, a by-election was held on 12 March 1924. The seat was won by the Cumann na nGaedheal candidate James O'Mara.

1923 by-election
Michael Hayes was also elected for the National University constituency and resigned his seat in Dublin South following the election. A by-election was held on 25 October 1923.

1923 general election

1922 general election
Kenneth Reddin, an election agent, published a sample ballot incorrectly stating that voters had only six preferences. Markievicz secured an injunction in the Republican Supreme Court against Reddin, who published an apology on election day in The Irish Times. The official notice of poll listed Markievicz's name first, but the ballot (and Reddin's sample) listed her third. She later complained that the electoral register was "rotten".

1921 general election

|}

See also
Dáil constituencies
Politics of the Republic of Ireland
Historic Dáil constituencies
Elections in the Republic of Ireland

References

External links
Oireachtas Members Database
Dublin Historic Maps: Parliamentary & Dail Constituencies 1780–1969 (a work in progress)
Dublin Historic Maps: Some Dublin and Kingstown Wards, Between 1780 and 1954
Dublin Historic Maps: Townlands of County Dublin

Dáil constituencies in County Dublin (historic)
1921 establishments in Ireland
1948 disestablishments in Ireland
Constituencies established in 1921
Constituencies disestablished in 1948